Demotic Greek or Dimotiki is the standard spoken language of Greece in modern times and, since the resolution of the Greek language question in 1976, the official language of Greece. "Demotic Greek" (with a capital D) contrasts with Katharevousa, which was used in formal settings, during the same period. In that context, Demotic Greek describes the specific non-standardized vernacular forms of Greek used by the vast majority of Greeks during the 19th and 20th centuries.

As is typical of diglossic situations, Katharevousa and Dimotiki complemented and influenced each other. Over time, Dimotiki became standardized. In 1976, it was made the official language of Greece.  It continued to evolve and is now called Standard Modern Greek. The term "demotic Greek" (with a minuscule d) also refers to any variety of the Greek language which has evolved naturally from Ancient Greek and is popularly spoken.

Basic features of Dimotiki
Demotic Greek differs in several ways from Ancient Greek and from subsequent learned forms of Greek. Syntactically, it favors parataxis over subordination.

Greek noun declensions underwent considerable alteration, with irregular and less productive forms being gradually replaced by more regular forms based on the old one:  (man) for ancient . Another feature was the merging of classical accusative and nominative forms, distinguishing them only by their definite articles, which continued to be declined as in Ancient Greek.

A result of this regularization of noun forms in Demotic is that the words of most native vocabulary end in a vowel, s or n, i.e. an even more restricted set of possible word-final sounds than Ancient Greek. Exceptions are foreign loans like  (bar), and learned forms  (from Ancient Greek , water), and exclamations like  (ach!, oh!)

Indirect object is usually expressed by prepending the word  to the accusative where Ancient Greek had  for accusative of motion toward; bare  is used without the article to express indefinite duration of time, or contracted with the definite article for definiteness especially with regard to place where or motion toward; or with the genitive, especially with regard to means or instrument. Using one noun with an unmarked accusative article-noun phrase followed by  contracted with the definite article of a second noun distinguishes between definite direct and indirect objects, whether real or figurative, e.g. «» or  «...» (lit. I put my hand upon the Gospel or ...in the fire, i.e. I swear it's true, I'm sure of it).

The verb system inherited from Ancient Greek gradually evolved, with the old future, perfect, and pluperfect tenses gradually disappearing; they were replaced with conjugated forms of the verb  (I have) to denote these tenses instead. The future tenses and the subjunctive and optative moods, and eventually the infinitive, were replaced by the modal/tense auxiliaries  and  used with new simplified and fused future/subjunctive forms. In contrast to this, Katharevousa employed older perfective forms and infinitives that had been for the most part lost in the spoken language, but in other cases it employed the same aorist or perfective forms as the spoken language, but preferred an archaizing form of the present indicative, e.g.  for Demotic  (I hide), which both have the same aorist form .

Demotic Greek also borrowed a significant number of words from other languages such as Italian and Turkish, something which katharevousa avoided.

Dimotiki and "Standard Modern Greek"
Dimotiki is commonly used interchangeably with "Standard Modern Greek". Nonetheless, these terms are not necessarily synonyms. While today's Standard Modern Greek is fundamentally a continuation of earlier Dimotiki, it also contains—especially in its written form and formal registers—numerous words, grammatical forms, and phonetical features that did not exist in the most "pure" and consistent forms of Dimotiki during the period of diglossia in Greece. Due to these admixtures, it could even be described as a product of a "merger" between earlier Dimotiki and Katharevousa.

Furthermore, in a broader sense, the Greek term  can also describe any naturally evolved colloquial language of the Greeks, not just that of the period of diglossia.

Examples of Modern Greek features that did not exist in Dimotiki
The following examples are intended to demonstrate Katharevousa features in Modern Greek. They were not present in traditional Demotic and only entered the modern language through Katharevousa (sometimes as neologisms), where they are used mostly in writing (for instance, in newspapers), but also orally, especially words and fixed expressions are both understood and actively used also by non-educated speakers. In some cases, the Demotic form is used for literal or practical meanings, while the Katharevousa is used for figurative or specialized meanings: e.g.  for the wing or feather of a bird, but  for the wing of a building or airplane or arm of an organisation.

Words and fixed expressions
  (interesting)
  (at least)
   (he abducted her)
    ... (it is a fact that ...)
    (for now)
Special dative forms:
  (thank God)
  (in the name [of] ...)
  (in cash)
  (following)
  (meanwhile)
  (in ignorance [of])
  (moreover)
  (working, literally on the deed)
  (percent, literally in a hundred)
  (with [one's] own hands)

Grammatical (morphological) features
 Declinable aorist participle, e.g.  (having delivered),  ([having been] born) - mostly in written language.
 Reduplication in the perfect. E.g.  (invited),  (obsolete)

Phonological features
Modern Greek features many letter combinations that were avoided in traditional Demotic:
  (e.g.  "misdemeanor"); Demotic preferred  (e.g.  "to err; to be guilty")
  (e.g.  "building, structure"); Demotic preferred  [e.g.  "(stone)mason"]
  (e.g.  "falsity, lie"); Demotic preferred  (e.g.  "liar")
  (e.g.  /  "I was sufficed / satisfied"); Demotic preferred  (e.g. )
  (e.g.  "yesterday"); Demotic preferred  [e.g. ]
 etc.

Radical demoticism
One of the most radical proponents of a language that was to be cleansed of all "educated" elements was Giannis Psycharis, who lived in France and gained fame through his work My Voyage (1888). Not only did Psycharis propagate the exclusive use of the naturally grown colloquial language, but he actually opted for simplifying the morphology of Katharevousa forms prescription.

For instance, Psycharis proposed changing the form of the neuter noun "light"  (gen. ) into  (gen. ). Such radical forms had occasional precedent in Renaissance attempts to write in Demotic, and reflected Psycharis' linguistic training as a Neogrammarian, mistrusting the possibility of exceptions in linguistic evolution. Moreover, Psycharis also advocated spelling reform, which would have meant abolishing most of the six different ways to write the vowel /i/ and all instances of double consonants.

As written and spoken Dimotiki became standardized over the next few decades, many compromises were made with Katharevousa (as is reflected in contemporary standard Greek) despite the loud objections of Psycharis and the radical "psycharist" camp within the proponents of Dimotiki's use. Eventually these ideas of radical demoticism were largely marginalized and when a standardized Dimotiki was made the official language of the Greek state in 1976, the legislation stated that Dimotiki would be used "without dialectal and extremist forms"—an explicit rejection of Psycharis' ideals.

References

Languages attested from the 19th century
Varieties of Modern Greek
Languages of Greece
Greek